Howard High School is a public high school located in Ellicott City, Maryland, United States. It is part of the Howard County Public School System, and serves families from Ellicott City, Elkridge, Hanover and Columbia, Maryland.

History
In 1938, Howard County used WPA money and bus contracts to close and consolidate many one-room schoolhouses into several central schools. Most of the county saw little school construction until after World War II. The school board recommended a single central high school for all white students in the county. By 1949, a state bond bill seemed imminent, and plans were refined for a central high school serving the first, second and sixth county districts. A site was picked at the family farm of General Charles D. Gaither, whose grandfather, George R. Gaither, once raised cavalry for J. E. B. Stuart onsite. Bids were opened on 26 April 1951 with prices ranging from $838,000 to $683,000. Four additional rooms were ordered in 1952 for an additional $30,000 in expenses. 12 additional acres were purchased from the Gaither family for $5,000, with board member Charles E. Miller contributing $2,500 for the land and demolition of the "colored house and corn crib" on the property.

Five names were considered for the school: John Eager Howard High School, Charles Carroll of Carrollton High School, General Gaither High School, Edwin Warfield High School, and Howard County High School. The school opened as "Howard County Senior High School" in 1952. In 1954, Marie T. Gaither offered 42 acres of adjoining land for $15,000 to expand the school grounds, which was declined by the school board.

A highlight commencement was once attended by Supreme Court Justice, Tom C. Clark who arrived by helicopter. The population is both culturally and economically diverse with over three quarters of the graduates enrolling in post-secondary institutions.

Student population

Renovation

At the opening of the 2006-2007 school year, Howard completed its renovations, which included a brand new cafeteria attached to an atrium, two new wings on opposite ends on the school, an auxiliary gym (in which the previous cafeteria was positioned), and a new track around the football field. The renovation also provided the Art and Science Department with a darkroom and several laboratories. At the end of the same school year, Howard placed a copper statue of a lion overlooking the Stadium Field.

Athletics
Howard High School has won the following state championships & athletic accomplishments:
2021 - Girls' Track and Field 
2019 - Girls' Cross Country
2018 - Boys' Chess
2015 - Boys' Lacrosse
2007 - Girls' Cross Country
2007 - Boys' Track & Field 
2006 - Boys' Track & Field
2006 - Girls' Cross County 
1995 - Girls' Track & Field 
1994 - Girls' Basketball 
1992 - Girls' Track & Field
1989 - Boys' Soccer 
1989 - Boys' Indoor Track 2A-1A
1985 - Boys' Indoor Track BC
1985 - Boys' Track & Field
1984 - Boys' Indoor Track BC
1980 - Girls' Volleyball 
1974 - Football

Notable alumni
Michael Chabon, Pulitzer Prize winning author
Bryce Hall, American social media personality
Alexis Ohanian, co-founder of Reddit

References and notes

External links

Howard High School website

Public schools in Howard County, Maryland
Public high schools in Maryland
Educational institutions established in 1952
1952 establishments in Maryland